Online gambling is any kind of gambling conducted on the internet. This includes virtual poker, casinos and sports betting. The first online gambling venue opened to the general public was ticketing for the Liechtenstein International Lottery in October 1994. Today the market is worth around $40 billion globally each year, according to various estimates.

Many countries restrict or ban online gambling. However it is legal in some states of the United States, some provinces in Canada, most countries of the European Union, and several nations in the Caribbean.

In many legal markets, online gambling service providers are required by law to have some form of licence provide services or advertise to residents there. For example, the United Kingdom Gambling Commission or the Pennsylvania Gaming Control Board in the United States.

Many online casinos and gambling companies around the world choose to base themselves in tax havens near their main markets. These destinations include Gibraltar, Malta, and Alderney in Europe, and in Asia, the Special Administrative Region of Macau was long considered a tax haven and known base for gambling operators in the region. However, in 2018 the EU removed Macau from their list of blacklisted tax havens.

History
In 1994, Antigua and Barbuda passed the Free Trade & Processing Act, allowing licences to be granted to organisations applying to open online casinos. Before online casinos, the first fully functional gambling software was developed by Microgaming, an Isle of Man-based software company. This was secured with software developed by CryptoLogic, an online security software company. Safe transactions became viable; this led to the first online casinos in 1994.

1996 saw the establishment of the Kahnawake Gaming Commission, which regulated online gaming activity from the Mohawk Territory of Kahnawake and issues gaming licences to many of the world's online casinos and poker rooms. This is an attempt to keep the operations of licensed online gambling organisations fair and transparent.

In the late 1990s, online gambling gained popularity; there were only fifteen gambling websites in 1996, but that had increased to 200 websites by the following year. A report published by Frost & Sullivan revealed that online gambling revenues had exceeded $830 million in 1998 alone. In the same year the first online poker rooms were introduced. Soon afterwards in 1999, the Internet Gambling Prohibition Act was introduced as a bill in the US Senate; it would have meant that a company could not offer any online gambling product to any U.S. citizen. But it did not pass. Multiplayer online gambling was also introduced in 1999.

In 2000, the first Australian Federal Government passed the Interactive Gambling Moratorium Act, making it illegal for any online casino not licensed and operating before May 2000 to operate. This meant Lasseter's Online became the only online casino able to operate legally in Australia; however, they cannot take bets from Australian citizens.

By 2001, the estimated number of people who had participated in online gambling rose to 8 million, and growth continued, despite continuing legal challenges to online gambling.

In 2008, H2 Gambling Capital estimated worldwide online gambling revenue at $21 billion.

In 2016, Statista predicted that the online gambling market would reach $45.86 billion, growing to $56.05 billion by 2018.

In 2022, online streaming platform Twitch banned popular gambling streams from their site. Cryptocurrency casino operators like Stake.com had been sponsoring streamers broadcasts of their live gambling sessions for several years.

Forms
The Internet has allowed new types of gambling to be available on line. Improvements in technology have changed betting habits just as video lottery terminals, keno and scratchcards changed the gambling industry in the 20th century.

Gambling has become one of the most popular and lucrative businesses on the Internet. In 2007 the UK Gambling Commission stated that the gambling industry had achieved a turnover of over £84 billion. This is partly due to the wide range of gambling options available to many different types of people. An article by Darren R. Christensen, Nicki A. Dowling, Alun C. Jackson and Shane A. Thomas said that a survey recorded in Australia showed that the most common forms of gambling were lotteries (46.5%), keno (24.3%), instant scratch tickets (24.3%), and electronic gaming machines (20.5%). Online gambling sites also started to hire celebrities as their brand ambassadors,  such as Mike Tyson, Cristiano Ronaldo, Conor McGregor, and Peter Crouch.

Poker

Online poker tables commonly offer Texas hold 'em, Omaha, Seven-card stud, razz, HORSE and other game types in both tournament and Cash game structures. Players play against each other rather than the "house", with the card room making its money through "rake" and through tournament fees.

Casinos

There are a large number of online casinos in which people can play casino games such as roulette, blackjack, pachinko, baccarat and many others. These games are played against the "house" which makes money because the odds are in its favor.

Sports betting

Sports betting is the activity of predicting sports results and placing a wager on the outcome. Usually the wager is in the form of money.

Bingo

Online bingo is the game of bingo (US|non-US) played on the Internet.

Lotteries
Most lotteries are run by governments and are heavily protected from competition due to their ability to generate large taxable cash flows. The first online lotteries were run by private individuals or companies and licensed to operate by small countries.  Most private online lotteries have stopped trading as governments have passed new laws giving themselves and their own lotteries greater protection.  Government-controlled lotteries now offer their games online.

UK National Lottery 
The UK National Lottery started in 1994 and is operated by the Camelot Group. Around 70% of UK adults play the National Lottery regularly, making the average annual sales over £5 billion apart from the year 2000-01 where sales dropped just below that. In its first seventeen years it has created over 2,800 millionaires.

In 2002 Camelot decided to rebrand the National Lottery main draw after falling ticket sales. The name National Lottery was kept as the general name for the organisation and the main draw was renamed Lotto. The advertising campaign for the new Lotto cost £72 million which included ten television advertisements featuring Scottish comedian Billy Connolly and one of the largest ever poster campaigns. The new brand and name had the slogan:
"Don't live a little, live a Lotto"

Horse racing betting
Horse racing betting comprises a significant percentage of online gambling wagers and all major Internet bookmakers, betting exchanges, and sports books offer a wide variety of horse racing betting markets.

Horse wagering using online methods across state lines is legal in several states in the United States. In 2006, the NTRA and various religious organizations lobbied in support of an act in Congress meant to limit online gambling. Some critics of the bill argued that the exemption of horse racing wagering was an unfair loophole. In response, the NTRA responded that the exemption was "a recognition of existing federal law", not a new development. Interstate wagering on horse racing was first made legal under the Interstate Horseracing Act written in 1978. The bill was rewritten in the early 2000s to include the Internet in closed-circuit websites, including simulcast racing, as compared to simply phones or other forms of communication.

Mobile gambling

Mobile gambling refers to playing games of chance or skill for money by using a remote device such as a  tablet computer, smartphone or a mobile phone with a wireless Internet connection.

In-play gambling
In-play gambling is a feature on many online sports betting websites that allows the user to bet while the event is in progress. A benefit of live in-play gambling is that there are much more markets. For example, in Association football a user could bet on which player will receive the next Yellow card, or which team will be awarded the next corner kick.

Advance-deposit wagering

Advance-deposit wagering (ADW) is a form of gambling on the outcome of horse races in which the bettor must fund his or her account before being allowed to place bets. ADW is often conducted online or by phone. In contrast to ADW, credit shops allow wagers without advance funding; accounts are settled at month-end. Racetrack owners, horse trainers and state governments sometimes receive a share of ADW revenues.

Funds transfers
The money for online gambling can come from credit card, electronic check, certified check, money order, wire transfer, or cryptocurrencies. Normally, gamblers upload funds to the online gambling company, make bets or play the games that it offers, and then cash out any winnings. Gamblers can often fund gambling accounts by credit card or debit card, and cash out winnings directly back to the card; most U.S. banks, however, prohibit the use of their cards for the purpose of Internet gambling, and attempts by Americans to use credit cards at Internet gambling sites are usually rejected. A number of electronic money services offer accounts with which online gambling can be funded.

Legal status

Antigua and Barbuda
Many of the companies operating out of the island nation of Antigua and Barbuda are publicly traded on various stock exchanges, specifically the London Stock Exchange. Antigua has met British regulatory standards and has been added to the UK's "white list", which allows licensed Antiguan companies to advertise in the UK.

The national government, which licenses Internet gambling entities, made a complaint to the World Trade Organization about the U.S. government's actions to impede online gaming. The Caribbean country won the preliminary ruling but WTO's appeals body somewhat narrowed that favorable ruling in April 2005. The appeals decision held that various state laws argued by Antigua and Barbuda to be contrary to the WTO agreements were not sufficiently discussed during the course of the proceedings to be properly assessed by the panel. However, the appeals panel also ruled that the Wire Act and two other federal statutes prohibiting the provision of gambling services from Antigua to the United States violated the WTO's General Agreement on Trade in Services. Although the United States convinced the appeals panel that these laws were "necessary" to protect public health and morals, the asserted United States defense on these grounds was ultimately rejected because its laws relating to remote gambling on horse-racing were not applied equally to foreign and domestic online betting companies, and thus the United States could not establish that its laws were non-discriminatory.

On 30 March 2007, the WTO confirmed that the U.S. "had done nothing to abide by an earlier verdict that labeled some U.S. Internet gambling restrictions as illegal."

On 19 June 2007, Antigua and Barbuda filed a claim with the WTO for US$3.4 billion in trade sanctions against the United States, and in particular, the ability for the country to suspend its enforcement of U.S. copyrights and patents and a punitive measure. On 28 January 2013, the WTO authorized the ability for Antigua and Bermuda to monetize and exploit U.S. copyrights as compensation for the country's actions; the country planned to form "a statutory body to own, manage and operate the ultimate platform to be created for the monetisation or other exploitation of the suspension of American intellectual property rights".

Australia

On 28 June 2001 the Australian Government passed the Interactive Gambling Act 2001 (IGA). The government said that the IGA was important to protect Australians from the harmful effects of gambling. The offense applies to all interactive gambling service providers, whether based in Australia or offshore, whether Australian or foreign owned. The IGA makes it an offence to provide an interactive gambling service to a customer physically present in Australia, but it is not an offence for Australian residents to play poker or casino games online. Sports betting online is legal in Australia, with many state government licensed sportsbooks in operation.

Canada
While the criminal code of Canada does not prohibit online gambling, it does prohibit any type of gambling at an establishment not owned or licensed by a provincial government. Not withstanding this fact, there are an estimated 1,200 to 1,400 offshore websites that make casino type games and other gambling activities available to Canadians. For online gambling operations within Canada's borders, the Canadian authorities are willing to prosecute, but as of this date, have only done so once, when British Columbia prosecuted Starnet Communications International ("SCI"), a Delaware corporation, run by residents of Vancouver, where one of the company's servers was located. The court found that SCI had sufficient contact with Canada to be prosecuted under its criminal code. SCI was fined $100,000 and forfeited nearly $4 million in profits. It has since moved its operations overseas.

In 2004, the British Columbia Lottery Corporation launched Canada's first legal online casino, PlayNow.com, which makes legal online gambling available to residents of British Columbia and Manitoba. A survey conducted in 2007 showed that only about 2.3% of Canadians reported participating in online gambling. However, in 2012, Manitoba Lotteries Minister Steve Ashton estimated that gamblers in Manitoba alone were spending $37 million a year at illegal online casinos. Quebec's lottery organization Loto-Quebec launched a similar service, known as Espacejeux.

According to John A. Cunningham, Joanne Cordingley, David C. Hodgins and Tony Toneatto a telephone survey was recorded in Ontario that shows there was a strong agreement that conceptions of gambling abuse as a disease or addiction were positively associated with belief that treatment is needed, while there was a strong agreement that disease or wrongdoing was positively associated with the credit that abstinence is required.

France

On 5 March 2009, France proposed new laws to regulate and tax Internet gambling. Budget minister Eric Woerth stated the French gambling market would expand to adapt to "Internet reality." He further stated "Rather than banning 25,000 websites, we'd rather give licenses to those who will respect public and social order."  Betting exchanges, however, will remain illegal under the new plans.

Germany
The German Interstate Treaty on gaming, which came into force on 1 January 2008, banned all forms of online gaming and betting in the country, with the exception of wagers on horse racing. The European Gaming & Betting Association turned to the European Commission with the request to take action against the German legislation, because such stringent legislation violated EU rules. In 2010, the European Court of Justice ruled that the monopolised gambling industry in Germany has to be liberalised. Schleswig-Holstein is the only German state that has already come up with their own gambling bill allowing gambling online. From 2012, casino operators can apply for an online gambling license in this state.

India

Online gambling is illegal in the state of Maharashtra under the "Bombay Wager Act". Other acts/legislations are silent with respect to online gambling/online gaming in India.  The most recent law to address gambling online was the Federal Information Technology Rules where such illegal activities may be blocked by Internet providers within India.  Another act is the Public Gaming Act of 1867.  States tend to operate on their own authority.

Online gambling legal issues in India are complicated in nature as Gambling in India is regulated by different states laws and online gambling is a central subject. To ascertain the position of Indian government, the Supreme Court of India sought the opinion of central government in this regard but the same was declined by the central government. This has made playing of online cards games like rummy, poker, etc. legally risky. Playing Rummy in India is legal as according to the verdict of Supreme Court of India, Rummy is a Game of skills and cannot be considered as Gambling.

On 3 September 2015, Central Board of Direct Taxes (CBDT) issued a Circular titled "Clarification on Tax Compliance for Undisclosed Foreign Income and Assets" under the black money act which directs the online poker players in the country to declare their money transactions on foreign poker sites through the e-wallets and virtual cards.

Israel
The Israel gambling law (Israeli Penal Law 5737 - 1977) does not refer specifically to online gambling (land based gambling and playing games of chances is prohibited except in the cases of the Israel Lottery and the Israeli Commission for Sports Gambling). In December 2005, the attorney general ordered all online gambling operations, online backgammon included, to close their businesses and at the same time commanded credit card companies to cease cooperating with online gambling websites. In May 2007, the attorney general had excluded the online backgammon website Play65 from the ruling, due to "the unique circumstances of the site's activity", allowing it to return to full activity in Israel.

In 2012, the Tel Aviv Police Commander ordered local ISPs to block access to several online gambling sites. The District Court invalidated this order. The Supreme Court dismissed an appeal in 2013, finding that the police do not have legal authority to issue such orders. The government responded by proposing a bill that will authorize such orders, referring to child pornography, drug trafficking and online gambling websites.

Poland 
In December 2016 the amendment to the Polish Gambling Act was scheduled to come into force on 1 April 2017. Online gambling will be only possible on the sites with Polish license.

Russia

Russian legislation, enacted in December 2006, prohibits online gambling altogether (as well as any gambling relying on telecommunications technology).

Singapore
In 2014, the Singapore parliament tabled the Remote Gambling Bill as a counter-measure against online gambling locally, while parliamentary member Denise Phua spoke against legalised gambling in Singapore.

Ukraine
Gambling was prohibited in Ukraine in 2009 after a fire occurred in an illegal gambling hall in Dnipro (former Dnipropetrovsk), in which nine people died.

The Law On Prohibition of Gambling Business, signed by then President of the Ukraine Viktor Yushchenko, made all forms of gambling, including slots machines, bookmaking and online gambling illegal in Ukraine.

Despite the 2009 law, many venues continued to operate using legal loopholes for many years. In early January 2020, over 900 such gambling operations were closed down in preparation for a legalised market.

On January the 24th 2020, legislators in the Verkhovna Rada passed the first stage of the law to reintroduce legal gambling in Ukraine. In August 2020 bill 2285-D passed, making online gambling, bookmaking, slot halls and casinos legal in Ukraine.

During the Russia-Ukraine war, several Russian online casinos were accused of targeting Ukrainian customers in order to sell their data to Russian security services.

Republic of Belarus

Online gambling has been legalized in Belarus since April 1, 2019.

United Kingdom

In 2003 Tessa Jowell, then Culture Secretary suggested a change in the British Gambling laws to keep up with advances in technology.

The Bill identified updates to the laws already in place in the UK, and also created the UK Gambling Commission to take over from the Gambling Board. The commission will have the power to prosecute any parties in breach of the guidelines set out by the bill and will be tasked with regulating any codes of practice they set forward. The Bill set out its licensing objectives, which are as follows:

Ensuring no link between gambling and crime or disorder
Ensuring that gambling is conducted fairly and openly
Protecting children and vulnerable adults from harm or exploitation

The Bill also set out guidelines stating that gambling will be unlawful in the UK unless granted a licence, permit or registration. It outlined the penalty for being in breach of these guidelines, that being a maximum of six months in prison, a fine, or both for each offence. Any person under 18 will not be allowed to gamble and it is an offence to invite or permit anyone under the age of 18 years to gamble.

The UK's Gambling Act 2005 passed in that year. In 2022, the Conservative government postponed (for the fourth time) the publication of a whitepaper detailing the process of an update to the 2005 act. A government spokesperson said that due to the departure of Prime Minister Boris Johnson the report would be delayed until a new leader's policies were in place. The next Prime Minister Liz Truss appointed Michelle Donelan as Secretary of State for Digital, Culture, Media and Sport, whose voting record indicates pro gambling reform views.

Remote gambling

The Bill defined remote gambling as,

"Gambling in which persons participate by the use of remote communication"

This would be using the internet, the telephone, radio, television of any other device used for communication. Any operator must have a separate licence for remote gambling and non-remote gambling. The licence must state what form the remote gambling would come in and any conditions appropriate to each operator. Offences for breaching remote gambling guidelines are the same as breaching non-remote gambling guidelines.

United States

Legislation on online gambling in the United States was first drafted in the late 1990s. Bob Goodlatte and Jon Kyl introduced bills to the Senate that would curb online gambling activities except for those that involved horse and dog races and state lotteries. Those bills were not passed.

The United States Court of Appeals for the Fifth Circuit ruled in November 2002 that the Federal Wire Act prohibits electronic transmission of information for sports betting across telecommunications lines but affirmed a lower court ruling that the Wire Act "'in plain language' does not prohibit Internet gambling on a game of chance."  But the federal Department of Justice continues, publicly, to take the position that the Wire Act covers all forms of gambling.

In April 2004 Google and Yahoo!, the two largest Internet search engines, announced that they were removing online gambling advertising from their sites. The move followed a United States Department of Justice announcement that, in what some say is a contradiction of the Appeals Court ruling, the Wire Act relating to telephone betting applies to all forms of Internet gambling, and that any advertising of such gambling "may" be deemed as aiding and abetting. Critics of the Justice Department's move say that it has no legal basis for pressuring companies to remove advertisements and that the advertisements are protected by the First Amendment.  In April 2005, Yahoo! instigated a restrictive policy about gambling ads.  The USDOJ has no authority to enact or interpret laws, including via announcement.

In July 2006, David Carruthers, the CEO of BetonSports, a company publicly traded on the London Stock Exchange, was detained in Texas while changing planes on his way from London to Costa Rica. He and ten other individuals had been previously charged in a sealed indictment with violations of US federal laws relating to illegal gambling.  While as noted above, a United States Appeals court has stated that the Wire Act does not apply to non-sports betting, the Supreme Court of the United States previously refused to hear an appeal of the conviction of Jay Cohen, where lower courts held that the Wire Act does make it illegal to own a sports betting operation that offers such betting to United States citizens.

The BetOnSports indictment alleged violations of at least nine different federal statutes, including 18 USC Sec. 1953 (Operation of an Illegal Gambling Business). Carruthers is currently under house arrest on a one million dollar bail bond.

In September 2006, Sportingbet reported that its chairman, Peter Dicks, was detained in New York City on a Louisiana warrant while traveling in the United States on business unrelated to online gaming. Louisiana is one of the few states that has a specific law prohibiting gambling online. At the end of the month, New York dismissed the Louisiana warrant.

Also in September 2006, just before adjourning for the midterm elections, both the House of Representatives and Senate passed the Unlawful Internet Gambling Enforcement Act of 2006 (as a section of the unrelated SAFE Port Act) to make transactions from banks or similar institutions to online gambling sites illegal. This differed from a previous bill passed only by the House that expanded the scope of the Wire Act. The passed bill only addressed banking issues. The Act was signed into law on 13 October 2006, by President George W. Bush. At the UIGEA bill-signing ceremony, Bush did not mention the Internet gambling measure, which was supported by the National Football League but opposed by banking groups. The regulation called for in the UIGEA was issued in November 2008.

In April 2007, Rep. Barney Frank (D-MA) introduced HR 2046, the Internet Gambling Regulation, Consumer Protection, and Enforcement Act, which would modify UIGEA by providing a provision for licensing of Internet gambling facilities by the director of the Financial Crimes Enforcement Network.  Several similar bills have been introduced since then in the House and Senate.

In June 2009, the U.S. Department of Justice seized over $34 million belonging to over 27,000 accounts in the Southern District of New York Action Against Online Poker Players.  This is the first time money was seized from individual players as compared to the gaming company.  Jeff Ifrah, the lawyer for one of the account management companies affected, said that the government "has never seized an account that belongs to players who are engaged in what [Ifrah] would contend is a lawful act of playing peer-to-peer poker online."

On 3 December 2009, the House Financial Services Committee held a hearing on UIGEA and Rep. Frank's Internet Gambling Regulation, Consumer Protection, and Enforcement Act of 2009 (H.R. 2267) where experts in the fields of online security and consumer safety testified that a regulatory framework for Internet gambling would protect consumers and ensure the integrity of Internet gambling financial transactions. On 28 July 2010, the committee passed H.R. 2267 by a vote of 41-22-1.  The bill would legalize and regulate online poker and some other forms of online gambling.

On 22 November 2010, the New Jersey state Senate became the first such US body to pass a bill (S490) expressly legalizing certain forms of online gambling. The bill was passed with a 29–5 majority. The bill allows bets to be taken by in-State companies on poker games, casino games and slots but excludes sports betting, although it allows for the latter to be proposed, voted on and potentially regulated separately in due course.  However, a Fairleigh Dickinson University PublicMind poll in April 2009 showed only 26% of New Jersey voters approved of online sports-betting. On a national level, two-thirds (67%) of voters polled by PublicMind in March 2010 opposed changing the law to allow online betting. Men were more likely than women (29–14%) and liberals more likely than conservatives (27–18%) to approve of changing the law to allow online betting.
In May 2012, FDU's PublicMind conducted a follow up study which asked voters if they favored or opposed online gaming/gambling and "allowing New Jersey casinos to run betting games online, over the Internet." The results showed that (31%) of voters favored while a sizable majority (58%) opposed the idea. Peter Woolley, director of the PublicMind, commented on the results: "Online gambling may be a good bet for new state revenue, but lots of voters don't think it's a good bet for New Jersey households."

On 15 April 2011, in U. S. v. Scheinberg et al. (10 Cr. 336), three online poker companies were indicted for violating U.S. laws that prohibit the acceptance of any financial instrument in connection with unlawful Internet gambling, that is, Internet gambling that involves a "bet or wager" that is illegal under the laws of the state where the bet is made. The indictment alleges that the companies used fraudulent methods to evade this law, for example, by disguising online gambling payments as purchases of merchandise, and by investing money in a local bank in return for the bank's willingness to process online poker transactions.  The companies argue that poker is a game of skill rather than a game of chance, and therefore, online poker is not unlawful Internet gambling. There are other legal problems with the government's case, and the indictments did not mention the Wire Act.  On 31 July 2012, it was announced that two of the three companies indicted for money laundering and forfeiture settled with the Manhattan U.S. Attorney for $731 million without legally admitting guilt. The government also asked the judge to approve a settlement with the third defendant, Absolute Poker. In March 2016, PokerStars spokesman Eric Hollreiser said his company finally had established an important beachhead in the U.S. market by being able to operate legally in New Jersey.

The online gambling laws also apply to online gambling platforms which exclusively use cryptocurrency to handle deposits and withdrawals. This is demonstrated by the 2015 landmark case of Seals with Clubs bitcoin poker site's run in with the law. This was the first criminal investigation of an illegally operating bitcoin gambling platform on US soil. The owner of the site, who operated out of Nevada, tried to justify the clear violation of both federal and state law by saying that the platform and players only ever used cryptocurrencies to do transactions, and those are not recognized as a currency by the federal government. Therefore, this constitutes social gambling. He was sentenced to two years probation and a $25,000 fine.

New Jersey Legalizes Online Sports Betting

On November 8, 2011, New Jersey voters were asked to consider "Public Question No. 1", also known as the Sports Betting Amendment. New Jersey required a majority vote to amend its state constitution. The result was 671,797 "Yes" (63.91%) to 379,339 "No" (36.09%). The voters' approval allowed the New Jersey legislature to legalize sports betting.

New Jersey state Senator Raymond Lesniak promptly introduced the Sports Wagering Act, S3113, on November 21, 2011. The act would decriminalize sports betting in New Jersey. It passed the New Jersey Senate and New Jersey General Assembly on January 9, 2012. Governor Chris Christie signed the act into law on January 17, 2012.

Sports Leagues Sue Governor Christie Twice

The leagues contended that New Jersey's new Sports Wagering Law violated the Professional and Amateur Sports Protection Act of 1992 (PASPA).

The United States District Court for the District of New Jersey ruled for the NCAA et al. New Jersey appealed the district court's ruling to the United States Court of Appeals for the Third Circuit, who affirmed the lower court's ruling. New Jersey then appealed the Circuit Court's ruling to the Supreme Court of the United States, who failed to grant Certiorari. Thus, New Jersey's Sports Wagering Act was successfully enjoined from going into effect.

New Jersey tried to legalize sports betting again on October 16, 2014, when the Senate and General Assembly passed the Sports Wagering Law. This legislation would partially repeal laws that criminalized sports betting. The law permitted state-licensed casinos and racetracks to provide sports betting. Moreover, the state would not be involved in the licensing or regulation of sports betting itself. Once again, US Sports Leagues opposed the law.

The plaintiffs asked the court to grant a preliminary injunction against the law, arguing it was a clear violation of PASPA.

On November 21, 2014, the New Jersey District Court ruled for the plaintiffs, deciding that the Sports Wagering Law violated PASPA. Once again, Governor Christie appealed to the U.S. Third Circuit Court of Appeals, who again upheld the lower court's opinion.

PASPA Overturned

On October 7, 2016, New Jersey appealed the Third Circuit Court of Appeals decision to the United States Supreme Court. The court granted certiorari on June 27, 2017, considering the question of whether a federal statute (PASPA) that prohibits modification or repeal of a state's law prohibiting private behavior impermissibly commandeers the power of the states.

 was argued before the Supreme Court on December 4, 2018. On May 14, 2018, the Supreme Court ruled 6–3 to reverse the Third Circuit Court of Appeal's decision, holding that PASPA's provision on banning state authorized sports betting violated the anti-commandeering doctrine of the Tenth Amendment of the U.S. Constitution.

PASPA was declared unconstitutional because it interfered with a state's right to repeal its own anti-gambling laws. Shortly thereafter, New Jersey offered legal sports betting to its residents. Many other states have since legalized online Sports betting for their residents.

Other countries
Various forms of online gambling are legal and regulated in many countries, including some provinces and territories of Canada, most members of the European Union and several nations in and around the Caribbean Sea.

Online gambling industry statistics

UK 
In the UK, between 2009 and 2010, 4% of adults had bet online. Between April 2010 and March 2011, online gambling which is regulated by the UK Gambling Commission yielded £660.74 million, a 5% increase on the previous year. The British regulated online gambling sector was worth a 12% market share of the British regulated gambling industry within the same time period. Most British consumer online gambling activity is on overseas regulated websites, and estimates place the UK consumer market for online gambling at £1.9 billion for 2010. (Approximately three times the size of the British regulated market). In the year to March 2011, 5000 adults were surveyed and reported that 11.2% of them had participated in at least one form of remote gambling in the previous four weeks. Approximately half of the respondents had only participated in National Lottery products. Another group of interviews conducted by the Gambling Commission.

In March 2011, the UK online gambling industry employed 6,077 full-time employees. A number that has declined since 2008 where 8,918 full-time employees were in employment within the industry. Also, there were 291 remote gambling activity licences held by 225 operators at this date. Three of the sectors within online gambling are betting, bingo and casino which between them turned over £13,456.07 million between April 2010 and March 2011. During this time period, betting turned over a substantial proportion of this amount, turning over £13,081.44 million, with bingo and casino turning over £26.75 million and £347.87 million respectively.

European Union (EU) 

According to the European Gaming and Betting Association (EGBA), online gambling is a growing sector within the EU, with gross gaming revenue (GGR) expected to reach €29.3 billion in 2022. According to EGBA, the EU online gambling market was valued at €22.2 billion GGR in 2018 - growing 11% from €20 billion GGR in 2017 - and accounted for 49.2% of the global online gambling market. The EU online gambling channelled or white market accounted for €15.9bn, reflecting an average EU-wide channelling rate of 71.7%. Online gambling now represents 23.2% of the total EU gambling market activity, while offline gambling (lotteries, casinos, bookmakers shops, etc.) had a total GGR of €73.5bn, accounting for 76.8% of the overall EU gambling market. In 2018, the UK market (34.2%) accounted for the largest portion of the EU online gambling market, based on GGR, followed by Germany (11.1%), France (8.8%) and Italy (8.1%).

Problem gambling

A 2015 review found evidence of higher rates of mental health comorbidites, as well as higher amounts of substance use, amongst  internet gamblers, compared to non internet gamblers. Causation, however, has not been established, and the review postulated that there may differences in the cohorts between internet and land-based problem gamblers.

In the United States in 1999 the National Gambling Impact Study stated "the high-speed instant gratification of Internet games and the high level of privacy they offer may exacerbate problem and pathological gambling". A UK government-funded review of previous research noted a small scale patient survey leading to press reports claiming that 75% of people who gamble online are "problem" or "pathological" gamblers, compared to just 20% of people who visit legitimate land-based casinos.

A study by the UK Gambling Commission, the "British Gambling Prevalence Survey 2010", found that approximately 0.9% of the adult population had problem gambling issues, more than shown in a previous study in 2007. The highest prevalence of problem gambling was found among those who participated in playing Poker at a pub or club (20.3%), Dog races (19.2%) and online slot machine style or instant win games (17%). Additionally the report noted a 15% increase in overall gambling since 2007, from a rate of 58% in 2007 to 73% in 2010. Significantly, the 2010 prevalence survey notes that whilst the overall gambling figure had increased, the prevalence among men at 75% was not dissimilar to the amounts in two previous surveys in 1999 and 2007 which were 76% and 71% respectively. However, the prevalence among women for 2010 was 71%, which was higher than 68% in 1999 and 65% in 2007.

In August 2014 the National Council of Problem Gambling (NCPG) partnered with the Gambling Integrity Services (GIS). The GIS will evaluate these recently regulated internet gambling operators in order to ensure they comply with NCPG's internet Responsible Gambling Standards.

A study released by the University of Buffalo in November 2014 states that the explosion of online gambling in the United States in the past decade has not given rise to more people with gambling problems.

According to Darren R. Christensen, Nicki A. Dowling, Alun C. Jackson and Shane A. Thomas a survey recorded in Australia shows that gambling severity rates were estimated at non-gambling (34.8%), non-problem gambling (57.4%), low risk gambling (5.3%), moderate risk (1.8%) and problem gambling (0.7%).

Money laundering
It has also been alleged that the largely unsupervised electronic funds transfers inherent in online gambling are being exploited by criminal interests to launder large amounts of money.  However, according to a US GAO study, "Banking and gaming regulatory officials did not view Internet gambling as being particularly susceptible to money laundering, especially when credit cards, which create a transaction record and are subject to relatively low transaction limits, were used for payment. Likewise, credit card and gaming industry officials did not believe Internet gambling posed any particular risks in terms of money laundering."

In 2011, the U.S. Attorney for the Southern District of New York filed United States v. Scheinberg, a federal criminal case against the founders of the three largest online poker companies, PokerStars, Full Tilt Poker and Cereus Poker Network (Absolute Poker/Ultimatebet), and a handful of their associates, which alleges that the defendants violated the Unlawful Internet Gambling Enforcement Act and engaged in bank fraud and money laundering in order to process transfers to and from their customers.

A BBC investigation in 2019 described how cryptocurrencies such as bitcoin were being used for under-age gambling, money-laundering and political corruption in the Caribbean island of Curaçao.

Player perception 
Due to the virtual nature of online gambling, it is hard for players to verify the authenticity of sites they are using. Unlike in physical casinos, randomness and deck shuffling cannot be verified by visual means unless the casino is provably fair. Players interact with other players through GUIs, which connect to the gambling site's server in a non-transparent manner. Players' attitudes towards sites plays an important role in online purchases and customer loyalty. Lack of trust in payment systems and security are primary reasons for avoiding online gambling. In an online survey of 10,838 online casino and poker players from over 96 countries, respondents reported a high level of mistrust of online gambling. 91.5% believed that reputable third party reports on randomness and payouts were important to gain their trust. However, contrasting research shows that seals-of-approval granted by these third parties does not have a strong influence on purchasing behavior, nor are customers usually aware of their existence.

Responsible Gambling Features (RGFs) are features that online gambling sites use to promote responsible behavior and reduce harm. These include limiting amounts that can be bet or deposited over a designated period of time, self-assessment tests for gambling problems, and warning signs of prolonged play or high expenditure. RGFs are usually opt-in features for players and are required by certain jurisdictions. For example, operators in Denmark, Germany, and Spain must provide deposit limits, but this is only voluntary for Australian operators. A sample of online poker players from Sweden indicated that RGFs increase their trust in a company and reduce their anxiety about winning from other players. However, in jurisdictions that mandate Responsible Gambling Features, only a small percentage of customers use them. In Australia, 0.8% used the deposit limit on SportsBet and 6% used deposit loss limits on BetFair Australia.

See also
 Gaming control board
 List of mergers and acquisitions in online gambling

References